Elevci is a Turkish village in the municipality of Centar Župa, North Macedonia.

Demographics
The village is inhabited by a Turkish speaking population consisting of Turks.

According to the 2002 census, the village had a total of 260 inhabitants. Ethnic groups in the village include:

Turks 260

References

Villages in Centar Župa Municipality
Turkish communities in North Macedonia